Cylindrepomus mantiformis is a species of beetle in the family Cerambycidae. It was described by Hüdepohl in 1989. It is known from Borneo.

References

Dorcaschematini
Beetles described in 1989